Tetyana Chorna is a former Ukrainian football midfielder, who played for Rossiyanka in the Russian Championship. She previously played for Lehenda Chernihiv and Metalurg Donetsk in the Ukrainian League and Lada Togliatti, Nadezhda Noginsk and Zvezda Perm in Russia.

National Team
She was a member of the Ukrainian national team and took part in the 2009 European Championship, playing as a starter against the Netherlands and Denmark.

Titles
 3 Russian Leagues (2004, 2007, 2010)
 5 Russian Cups (2005, 2006, 2008, 2009, 2010)

Lehenda Chernihiv
 Ukrainian League (2000)

Individual
 Ukrainian Woman Footballer of the Year: (1) 2011

References

External links
 

1981 births
Living people
Footballers from Chernihiv
Ukrainian women's footballers
WFC Lehenda-ShVSM Chernihiv players
WFC Donchanka Donetsk players
Expatriate women's footballers in Russia
Ukrainian expatriate women's footballers
FC Lada Togliatti (women) players
Nadezhda Noginsk players
Zvezda 2005 Perm players
WFC Rossiyanka players
Ukraine women's international footballers
Women's association football forwards
Ukrainian expatriate sportspeople in Russia